Adolph Braeckeveldt (Sint-Denijs-Westrem, 6 October 1912 — Lovendegem, 4 August 1985) was a Belgian professional road bicycle racer. In 1937, he won one stage of the 1937 Tour de France, in a joint victory with Heinz Wengler.

Major results

1935
Charleroi
GP van Noord-Vlaanderen
Kruishoutem
1936
GP de Wallonie
1937
Drie Zustersteden
Tour of Belgium
La Flèche Wallonne
1937 Tour de France:
Winner stage 17B (ex aequo with Heinz Wengler)
1938
Aalst
GP de Wallonie
GP van Noord-Vlaanderen
1939
GP de Wallonie
Zwijndrecht
1944
Sint-Eloois Winkel

External links 

Official Tour de France results for Adolph Braeckeveldt

Belgian male cyclists
1912 births
1985 deaths
Belgian Tour de France stage winners
Sportspeople from Ghent
Cyclists from East Flanders
20th-century Belgian people